HMS Bird was an 8-gun survey sloop of the Royal Navy, in service from 1764 to 1775 and engaged in an early coastal survey of Ireland.

The small and lightly-armed vessel was  purchased on the stocks in May 1764 from shipwright Henry Bird of Rotherithe. She measured 75  tons burthen and was armed with 8 small guns.

She was fitted out at Deptford dockyard between May and August 1764 at a total cost of £664 and commissioned thereafter under Lieutenant John Cowan. Launched in 1765, she spent four years conducting coastal survey work along the Irish shore, returning to Deptford for refitting in 1769.

Bird was broken up at Deptford Dockyard in March 1775.

References

Bibliography
 
 

Sloops of the Royal Navy
1765 ships
Ships built in Rotherhithe
Survey vessels of the Royal Navy